Robert Lowes (17 April 1904 – 1968) was a British weightlifter. He competed in the men's middleweight event at the 1924 Summer Olympics.

References

External links
 

1904 births
1968 deaths
British male weightlifters
Olympic weightlifters of Great Britain
Weightlifters at the 1924 Summer Olympics
People from Southwark